Jones Creek is a stream in western Jefferson County, Missouri. It is a tributary of Big River.

The source is the confluence of the North and West Forks located at:  and the confluence with Big River is at: .

The identity of the Jones the creek is named after is unknown.

See also
List of rivers of Missouri

References

Rivers of Jefferson County, Missouri
Rivers of Missouri